In logic, mathematics and linguistics, And is the truth-functional operator of logical conjunction; the and of a set of operands is true if and only if all of its operands are true.

An operand of a conjunction is a conjunct.

Beyond logic, the term "conjunction" also refers to similar concepts in other fields:

 In natural language, the denotation of expressions such as English "and".
 In programming languages, the short-circuit and control structure.
 In set theory, intersection.
 In lattice theory, logical conjunction (greatest lower bound).
 In predicate logic, universal quantification.

Notation

In Jan Łukasiewicz's prefix notation for logic, the operator is K, for Polish koniunkcja. Notably, in Microsoft Excel, the AND function is a postfix operator.

Definition
Logical conjunction is an operation on two logical values, typically the values of two propositions, that produces a value of true if and only if (also known as iff) both of its operands are true.

The conjunctive identity is true, which is to say that AND-ing an expression with true will never change the value of the expression. In keeping with the concept of vacuous truth, when conjunction is defined as an operator or function of arbitrary arity, the empty conjunction (AND-ing over an empty set of operands) is often defined as having the result true.

Truth table

The truth table of :

Defined by other operators
In systems where logical conjunction is not a primitive, it may be defined as

or

Introduction and elimination rules
As a rule of inference, conjunction introduction is a classically valid, simple argument form. The argument form has two premises, A and B. Intuitively, it permits the inference of their conjunction.

A,
B.
Therefore, A and B.

or in logical operator notation:

Here is an example of an argument that fits the form conjunction introduction:

Bob likes apples.
Bob likes oranges.
Therefore, Bob likes apples and Bob likes oranges.

Conjunction elimination is another classically valid, simple argument form. Intuitively, it permits the inference from any conjunction of either element of that conjunction.

A and B.
Therefore, A.

...or alternatively,

A and B.
Therefore, B.

In logical operator notation:

...or alternatively,

Negation

Definition 
In terms of the object language, this reads

This formula can be seen as a special case of

when  is a false proposition.

Other proof strategies 
If  implies , then both  as well as  prove the conjunction false:

In other words, a conjunction can actually be proven false just by knowing about the relation of its conjuncts, and not necessary about their truth values.

This formula can be seen as a special case of

when  is a false proposition.

Either of the above are constructively valid proofs by contradiction.

Properties
commutativity: yes

associativity: yes

distributivity: with various operations, especially with or

idempotency: yes

monotonicity: yes

truth-preserving: yesWhen all inputs are true, the output is true.

falsehood-preserving: yesWhen all inputs are false, the output is false.

Walsh spectrum: (1,-1,-1,1)

Nonlinearity: 1 (the function is bent)

If using binary values for true (1) and false (0), then logical conjunction works exactly like normal arithmetic multiplication.

Applications in computer engineering

In high-level computer programming and digital electronics, logical conjunction is commonly represented by an infix operator, usually as a keyword such as "AND", an algebraic multiplication, or the ampersand symbol & (sometimes doubled as in &&). Many languages also provide short-circuit control structures corresponding to logical conjunction.

Logical conjunction is often used for bitwise operations, where 0 corresponds to false and 1 to true:

 0 AND 0  =  0,
 0 AND 1  =  0,
 1 AND 0  =  0,
 1 AND 1  =  1.

The operation can also be applied to two binary words viewed as bitstrings of equal length, by taking the bitwise AND of each pair of bits at corresponding positions. For example:

 11000110 AND 10100011  =  10000010.

This can be used to select part of a bitstring using a bit mask.  For example, 10011101 AND 00001000  =  00001000 extracts the fifth bit of an 8-bit bitstring.

In computer networking, bit masks are used to derive the network address of a subnet within an existing network from a given IP address, by ANDing the IP address and the subnet mask.

Logical conjunction "AND" is also used in SQL operations to form database queries.

The Curry–Howard correspondence relates logical conjunction to product types.

Set-theoretic correspondence
The membership of an element of an intersection set in set theory is defined in terms of a logical conjunction: x ∈ A ∩ B if and only if (x ∈ A) ∧ (x ∈ B). Through this correspondence, set-theoretic intersection shares several properties with logical conjunction, such as associativity, commutativity and idempotence.

Natural language
As with other notions formalized in mathematical logic, the logical conjunction and is related to, but not the same as, the grammatical conjunction and in natural languages.

English "and" has properties not captured by logical conjunction.  For example, "and" sometimes implies order having the sense of "then". For example, "They got married and had a child" in common discourse means that the marriage came before the child.

The word "and" can also imply a partition of a thing into parts, as "The American flag is red, white, and blue."  Here, it is not meant that the flag is at once red, white, and blue, but rather that it has a part of each color.

See also

 And-inverter graph
 AND gate
 Bitwise AND
 Boolean algebra (logic)
 Boolean algebra topics
 Boolean conjunctive query
 Boolean domain
 Boolean function
 Boolean-valued function
 Conjunction elimination
 De Morgan's laws
 First-order logic
 Fréchet inequalities
 Grammatical conjunction
 Logical disjunction
 Logical negation
 Logical graph
 Operation
 Peano–Russell notation
 Propositional calculus

References

External links

Wolfram MathWorld: Conjunction

Conjunction
Semantics